Vice Admiral Ajendra Bahadur Singh, PVSM, AVSM, VSM, ADC is a former flag officer of the Indian Navy. He last served as the Flag Officer Commanding-in-Chief (FOC-in-C), Western Naval Command from 29 November 2021 succeeding Vice Admiral R. Hari Kumar on his elevation. Previously, he served as the Flag Officer Commanding-in-Chief (FOC-in-C), Eastern Naval Command of the Indian Navy. He assumed the position on 1 March 2021 after the appointment of Vice Admiral Atul Kumar Jain as the is the Vice Chief of Defence Staff. He was the Deputy Chief of Integrated Defence Staff (Doctrine Organisation Training) and served Chief of Staff, Western Naval Command prior to this appointment.

Early life and education 
Singh is an alumnus of National Defence Academy, Pune and Defence Services Staff College, Wellington. He did his schooling from UP Sainik School Lucknow. He was awarded the Scudder Medal for standing first in the course at University of Madras during his course at DSSC. He also has a master's degree in Global security from Cranfield University, United Kingdom.

Career 
Singh was commissioned into the Indian Navy on 1 July 1983. He has commanded various ships including INS Veer, INS Vindhyagiri, INS Trishul and INS Viraat. He is considered to be a specialist in navigation and aircraft direction. He has also served as the Navigating Officer of INS Kamorta, during Operation Pawan, and INS Ranjit. He was the Fleet Navigating Officer of the Western Naval Fleet during Operation Parakaram.

His important staff appointments include Deputy Director and Principal Director, Directorate of Naval Plans at Naval Headquarters  where he also setup Directorate of Strategy, Concepts and Transformation as the Principal Director.  Other staff appointments include Flag Officer AOB Project, Assistant Chief of Naval Staff (Policy and Plans) at Naval Headquarters and Flag Officer Commanding, Eastern Fleet on 7 October 2014.

His instructional appointments include an instructor at National Defence Academy, Pune; an instructor at Navigation and Direction School, Kochi; and Directing Staff at Defence Services Staff College, Wellington.

He was promoted to Flag rank in 2012 and was awarded the Vishisht Seva Medal (2011) and Ati Vishisht Seva Medal (2016) for his service.

Awards

Personal life 

Singh is married to Charu Singh and has two daughters, Ambika and Ajita.

Gallery

References 

Indian Navy admirals
Flag Officers Commanding Eastern Fleet
Recipients of the Vishisht Seva Medal
Recipients of the Ati Vishisht Seva Medal
National Defence Academy (India) alumni
Living people
Year of birth missing (living people)
Recipients of the Param Vishisht Seva Medal
Defence Services Staff College alumni
Academic staff of the Defence Services Staff College